Ja imam talenat! 2011-12 was a series of the Serbian edition of the Got Talent franchise. It was the third series broadcast in Serbia.

For the first time since the show's debut, the judging panel was altered – Danica Maksimović was replaced with Mina Lazarević. The press reported that Maksimović and the producers couldn't reach an agreement on her fee, so it was decided that Mina would take her place.

The first episode of the series was aired on 20 November 2011. In addition to the weekly auditions show, during the workdays a companion show is broadcast.

This season, the logo was changed; the new logo looked like the one used for the fifth series of the British version of the show, with a slightly altered colour scheme.

Auditions
Over 4000 auditionees performed in front of the judges in September 2011, in Terazije Theatre. Prior to this, contestants had to audition in front of the production team. For this season, some of the contestant came from countries other than Serbia, including a singer from Tunisia, and a male oriental dancer from Croatia.

Semi-finals
Semi-finals are broadcast live from RTS' studios in Filmski Grad. After all the acts perform, there is a 15 minute break, when the judges are interviewed and guests perform, during which viewers can vote. This year the semifinal shows are broadcast without ad breaks.

Semi-final 1
Aired on: 29 January 2012

Guest performer: Milica i Nenad

Semi-final 2
Aired on: 5 February 2012

Guest performer: Kiki Lesendrić i Piloti

Semi-final 3
Aired on: 12 February 2012

Guest performer: Zemlja gruva - "Najlepše želje"

Semi-final 4
Aired on: 19 February 2012

Guest performer: Eva Braun

Semi-final 5
Aired on: 26 February 2012

Guest performer: Negative; Sergej Trifunović

Final
Aired on: 4 March 2012

References

Ja imam talenat!
2011 Serbian television seasons
2012 Serbian television seasons